Lavrentia (Levkadia) Herasymiv (alternatively transliterated Harasymiv, in ) was an ethnic Ukrainian Soviet Greek Catholic nun and martyr.

Lavrentia Herasymiv, born Levkadia, on September 30, 1911 in Rudnyky, Lviv Region. She became a nun in 1933. In 1950, she was arrested by the NKVD and sentenced to exile in Tomsk Oblast. She was sick with tuberculosis when she arrived and only one family agreed to give her a place to live. Here she lived with a paralyzed man, behind a partition. She never received a proper medical attention.

On August 28, 1952, she died in Kharsk in Siberia's Tomsk Region.

Testimony of Sister Lavrentia's capture

References

External links 
 Біографія Лаврентії Гарасимів на сторінці Ватикану
 Блаження Лаврентія Гарасимів
 Могилы ссыльных монахинь на кладбище села Харск // mapofmemory.org (Карта памяти)

1911 births
1952 deaths
Catholic martyrs
Soviet nuns
20th-century Eastern Catholic nuns
Ukrainian nuns